The Syrian Democratic Forces (SDF) is a coalition of ethnic militias and rebel groups in North and East Syria (AANES). An alliance of forces formed during the Syrian civil war composed primarily of Kurdish, Arab, and Assyrian/Syriac, as well as some smaller Armenian, Turkmen and Chechen forces. It is militarily led by the People's Protection Units (YPG), a Kurdish militia recognized as a terrorist group by Turkey. SDF also includes several ethnic militias, and various factions of the Syrian opposition's Free Syrian Army. Founded in October 2015, the SDF states its mission as fighting to create a secular, democratic and federalised Syria. According to Turkey, the Syrian Democratic Forces has direct links to the PKK.

The primary opponents of the SDF are the various Islamist and Arab nationalist forces supported by Turkey, involved in the civil war, in particular al-Qaeda affiliates, the Islamic State of Iraq and the Levant (ISIL), the Syrian National Army (TFSA), the Turkish Armed Forces, and their allies. The SDF has focused primarily on the so-called Islamic State, successfully driving them from important strategic areas, such as Al-Hawl, Shaddadi, Tishrin Dam, Manbij, al-Tabqah, Tabqa Dam, Baath Dam, and ISIL's former capital of Raqqa. In March 2019, the SDF announced the total territorial defeat of ISIS in Syria, with the SDF taking control of the last stronghold in Baghuz.

Since the territorial defeat of ISIL, the SDF has increasingly been involved with resisting the growing Turkish occupation of northern Syria.

Establishment

Foundation 
The establishment of the SDF was announced on 11 October 2015 during a press conference in al-Hasakah. The alliance built on longstanding previous cooperation between the founding partners. While the People's Protection Units (Yekîneyên Parastina Gel, YPG) and the Women's Protection Units (Yekîneyên Parastina Jin, YPJ) had been operating throughout the regions of the Autonomous Administration of North and East Syria, the other founding partners were more geographically focused.

Geographically focused on the Euphrates Region were the YPG's partners in the Euphrates Volcano joint operations room, several mainstream Syrian rebel factions of the Free Syrian Army, who had helped defend the Kurdish town of Kobanî during the Siege of Kobanî. Liwa Thuwwar al-Raqqa had been expelled by the al-Nusra Front and ISIL from the city of Raqqa for its alliance with the YPG. The group participated in the capture of Tell Abyad from the Islamic State.

Geographically focused on the Jazira Region in northeast Syria were the Assyrian Syriac Military Council (Mawtbo Fulhoyo Suryoyo, MFS) and the al-Sanadid Forces of the Arab Shammar tribe, both of whom had cooperated with the YPG in fighting ISIL since 2013. The MFS is further politically aligned with the YPG via their shared secular ideology of democratic confederalism, which in the Assyrian community is known as the Dawronoye movement.

Geographically focused on the Manbij Region was the Army of Revolutionaries (Jaysh al-Thuwar, JAT), itself an alliance of several groups of diverse ethnic and political backgrounds, who had in common that they had been rejected by the mainstream Syrian opposition for their secular, anti-Islamist views and affiliations.

Signatory groups 
The following groups signed the founding document:

 People's Protection Units (Yekîneyên Parastina Gel, YPG)
 Women's Protection Units (Yekîneyên Parastina Jin, YPJ)
 Al-Sanadid Forces
 Syriac Military Council (Mawtbo Fulhoyo Suryoyo, MFS)
 Liwa Thuwwar al-Raqqa
 Euphrates Volcano
 Army of Revolutionaries (Jaysh al-Thuwar, JAT)
 99th Infantry Brigade
 Brigade Groups of al-Jazira

Political representation 
On 10 December 2015, after a two-day conference, the Syrian Democratic Council was established. Human rights activist Haytham Manna and Ilham Ehmed were elected co-chairman/woman at its founding. The Assembly establishing the Syrian Democratic Council was made up of 13 members of different ethnic, economic and political backgrounds.

Size, growth and composition 
The SDF was in control of about 25% of the territory of Syria. In 2018, following a Turkish invasion into north west Syria, the SDF left Afrin. In October 2019, the SDF had to retreat from Tell Abyad and Ras al-Ayn after a renewed Turkish invasion of Syrian territory.

2015 
At the time of its founding in late 2015, The Economist described the SDF as "essentially a subsidiary of the Kurdish YPG". At the end of October, the al-Shaitat tribal militia, the Desert Hawks Brigade, joined the SDF to fight ISIL in the southern countryside of Hasakah Governorate. In November, the FSA group Euphrates Jarabulus Battalions announced its accession to the SDF. In December, members of the Deir ez-Zor Governorate-based Arab tribe al-Shaitat joined the SDF, sending fighters to al-Shaddadah.

2016 

With continuous growth in particular due to Arab groups and volunteers joining, in March 2016 only an estimated 60% of the men and women in the SDF fighting force were ethnic Kurds. Growth in particular of Arab, Turkmen and Assyrian participation in the SDF has since continued. In an interview on the first anniversary of the SDF's founding, spokesman Talal Silo, an ethnic Turkmen and former commander of the Seljuq Brigade, stated that "we started with 13 factions and now there are 32 factions", and that "90 percent" of the SDF growth since it began its operations were ethnic Arabs. In the context of the November 2016 Northern Raqqa offensive, The Economist said the SDF fighting force to be composed of "about 20,000 YPG fighters and about 10,000 Arabs". The next month in December 2016, Colonel John Dorrian, the Operation Inherent Resolve spokesman, stated that the SDF contained around 45,000 fighters, of which more than 13,000 were Arabs.
 On 6 January 2016 an additional 400 members of the Arab Deir ez-Zor Governorate-based tribe al-Shaitat joined the SDF, sending fighters to Al-Shaddadah.
 On 5 February 2016, a group called Martyrs of Dam Brigade from an Arab village called al-Makhmar (liberated by the Syrian Democratic Forces in the Tishrin Dam offensive) joined the Northern Sun Battalion and the SDF.
 On 28 February 2016, a group called Martyr Qasim Areef Battalion from Sarrin was formed and joined the Army of Revolutionaries and the SDF.
 On 10 March 2016, a group called the Soldiers of the Two Holy Mosques Brigade joined the Syrian Democratic Forces as part of the Northern Sun Battalion. It was formerly part of the Army of Mujahideen's 19th Division. The group operated in the northern Aleppo Governorate countryside, and also have a presence in Aleppo city and Kobani.
 On 12 March 2016, it was reported that more than 200 locals from the earlier liberated areas around the town of Shaddadi joined the SDF, most of them Arabs.
 On 19 March 2016, it was reported that a group under the name of Liwa Ahrar al-Raqqa ("Free Raqqa Brigade") joined the SDF. The group had earlier been known under the name of Liwa al-Jihad fi Sabeel Allah ("Jihad in the Path of God Brigade") and had in September 2014 been part of the Euphrates Volcano operations room.
 On 2 April 2016 the SDF established the Manbij Military Council with the goal of securing the city of Manbij and its surrounding countryside (Manbij offensive). The council also included previously unknown groups such as the Manbij Revolutionaries Battalion, or the Manbij Turkmen Brigade which joined the Northern Sun Battalion of the Army of Revolutionaries.
 On 20 June 2016, a group called the Tel Rifaat Revolutionaries Battalion, with 250 members, joined the Kurdish Front of the Army of Revolutionaries.
 On 23 June 2016 in the al-Shaddadah area, 158 al-Shaitat tribesmen from the FSA group Elite Forces, which was not yet an SDF component group at the time, defected to join the SDF component group, the Desert Hawks Brigade, consisting of members of that tribe.
 On 14 August 2016, after securing Manbij, the SDF established the al-Bab Military Council with the goal of securing the city of al-Bab and its surrounding countryside.
 On 21 August, in a similar fashion to the establishment of the Manbij and al-Bab Military Councils, the SDF established the Jarablus Military Council with the goal of securing the city of Jarablus and its surrounding countryside. The council also includes the newly established group, the Manbij Revolutionary Brigades. The commander of the council, General Sattar Jader from Jarabulus Hawks Brigades, was assassinated the next day, a suspect was later arrested.
 On 13 September 2016 the al-Nukhbat Brigade, consisting of members from the al-Shaitat and Shammar tribes and led by Ahmad Jarba, joined the SDF. While some of its members already had earlier defected and joined the SDF, the event was called a major political coup for the SDF, as Jarba was the former President of the National Coalition for Syrian Revolutionary and Opposition Forces and now agreed to work with the Syrian Democratic Council framework instead.
 On 14 October 2016, the Free Officers Union, led by Hussam Awak, said to number in the hundreds joined the SDF.
 On 31 October 2016, an all-female battalion was established within' the al-Bab Military Council.
 On 8 December 2016, the Deir ez-Zor Military Council was established. The founding members consist of remnants of the former Free Syrian Army council of the same name, expelled from the city by the Islamic State in 2014, having joined the SDF in November 2016.

2017 
According to a March 2017 statement of the Spokesman for the International Coalition forces, U.S. Colonel John Dorrian, 75 percent of the SDF forces fighting in Operation Wrath of Euphrates to isolate ISIL's de facto capital of Raqqa were Syrian Arabs, a reflection of the demographic composition of that area. "The Syrian Democratic Forces are a multi-ethnic and multi-sectarian organization, and that is one of the reasons why we're working with them and they have continued to build the Arab element of their force." Concerning the SDF in general, Lieutenant General Stephen Townsend in the same month said that "I'm seeing what is probably a pretty broad coalition of people and the Kurds may be providing the leadership, because they have a capable leader who's stepped up to this challenge. And they are providing some of the organisational skill, but I see a large contingent about 23 to 25, 000 so far and growing, Arabs, who are marching to liberate their part of northern Syria. So, I don't see a Kurdish state. I see a multi-cultural, multi-party, multi-ethnic, multi-sectarian Syrian region being liberated from ISIS. Over."

Late June, an analysis by the Counter Terrorism Center at West Point said "growing acceptance of the SDF by Sunni Arab rebel groups" and more generally "growing legitimacy of the SDF". Another analysis as of late June described the YPG as "only one faction of many within the SDF", however that "it's the YPG that makes the SDF reliable and effective. The SDF's other components function as auxiliaries to the SDF's 'backbone', the YPG, which ensures effective, unitary command and control."
 On 13 February, the first YPG/YPJ regiment in the Euphrates Region was declared. The second regiment, named Şehîd Şevger Kobanî Regiment was established on 18 February. A total of 4 regiments were declared.
 On 25 February 2017, the YPG agreed to hand over security in the Assyrian towns along the Khabur River to the Khabour Guards and Nattoreh which joined the SDF.
 On 27 February 2017, the first YPG/YPJ regiment in the Afrin Region, named Martyr Xebat Dêrik Regiment was declared.
 On 8 April 2017, the Jazeera Knights Brigade was established.
 On 10 April 2017, two new YPG/YPJ regiments, named Martyr Gabar Regiment and Dêrik and Martyr Zana Regiment were established in the Jazira Region.
 On 4 May 2017, the International Anti-Fascist Battalion was renamed to the YPG International Battalion and became a part of the YPG.
 On 17 May 2017, the Raqqa Internal Security Forces were established.
 On 8 June, between 60 and 70 Turkish-backed Free Syrian Army fighters, including several Sultan Murad Division commanders, defected to the Syrian Army and the SDF during infighting between TFSA factions.
 On 10 July, an all-female Arab SDF group was established in Deir ez-Zor, the Martyr Amara Arab Women's Battalion, named after a female Arab SDF fighter that died in combat. Their area of focus will be the Deir ez-Zor Governorate. The group currently consists of 35 fighters from the cities of Hama, al-Raqqa, Deir ez-Zor and Hasakah, along with the town of al-Shaddadah.
 On 15 August, the Revolutionary Forces was formed as part of the SDF in northern Aleppo, with the intent to fight the Turkish occupation of northern Syria.
 On 25 August 800 fighters left the Elite Forces and were integrated into the ranks of the SDF and its Deir ez-Zor Military Council. The fighters said the Elite Forces were committing corruption. These forces consist of 7 units of al-Baggara and al-Shaitat tribal fighters stationed in the eastern Raqqa and southern Hasaka countrysides.
 On 4 September, a faction of the Northern Brigade, which is a TFSA unit, defected to the SDF.
 Around 10 September, dozens of militiamen of the pro-government Forces of the Fighters of the Tribes joined the SDF. These militiamen had previously been overrun by ISIL during the Central Syria campaign and retreated into SDF-held areas in order to avoid being captured by the Islamist militants. Feeling abandoned by their old commander, they eventually decided to stay with the SDF.
 At some point during the Battle of Raqqa (2017), the "Elite Forces" fell out with the SDF, and officially left the alliance. Thereafter, the group reportedly disintegrated.
 On 15 November 2017, Talal Silo defected or surrendered to the Turkish Army, the nature of his leaving the SDF being up for dispute.
 On 27 November 2017, the Martyr Adnan Abu Amjad Regiment, consisting of 250 fighters was established and joined the Manbij Military Council
 On 20 December 2017, Hussam Awak announced his resignation from the SDF on his Facebook page without providing any reasons.

2018 

 On 13 January 2018, it was announced that the US-led Coalition would train a group called the Syrian Border Security Force (BSF), and would aim to reach 30,000 fighters, half of those being composed by current SDF members.
 On 20 January 2018, Kino Gabriel, the spokesman for the Syriac Military Council, was also made the spokesman for the SDF.
 In early June 2018, the Brigade For The Liberation of Idlib and Afrin, and the Idlib Revolutionaries Brigade where established.
 In July 2018, the first Sapper unit was established.
 On 1 August 2018, the first Special Forces Regiment was formed.
 On 24 September 2018, the Assyrian Democratic Party announced the creation of a united military leadership for Nattoreh and the Khabour Guards. The united force will known as the "Ashur Forces".

2019 
 On 23 March 2019, the SDF announced the seizure of the last of ISIS territory in Syria after capturing the Syrian city of Baghuz.
 On 24 April 2019, the Armenian Martyr Nubar Ozanyan Brigade was founded in the Marziya Church in Tell Goran on the 104th Armenian Genocide Remembrance Day.
 On 6 July 2019, the MFS and Khabour Guards announced the formation of the Syriac-Assyrian Military Council in order to unify the Assyrian-Syriac military organizations within the Khabour region. The declaration said the military council would work within the political ideals of the Syriac Union Party and the Syrian Democratic Council.
In June & July 2019, ten military councils were formed.
 On 9 October 2019, Turkey started bombardment on SDF territory for a planned invasion called Operation Peace Spring. after American troops withdrew from the Syrian-Turkish border, leading to international condemnation of the invasion with only Azerbaijan and the -stan countries excluding Afghanistan supporting the invasion.

Support by the U.S.-led coalition 

 On 12 October 2015, the Pentagon confirmed U.S. C-17 transport aircraft dropped 100 pallets with 45 tons of arms and ammunition over SDF-controlled territory in the Autonomous Administration of North and East Syria. Polat Can, spokesman of the SDF component militia People's Protection Units (YPG), identified the freight as being "assault rifles, mortars and ammunition, but no TOW anti-tank missiles nor anti-aircraft weapons". The airdrop came only days after the Pentagon had officially abandoned its failed $500 million train-and-equip program that armed mainstream opposition groups who were also opposed to ISIL.
 During the SDF's February 2016 al-Shaddadi offensive, there were US special forces embedded with the SDF forces who coordinated airstrikes against ISIL with the SDF.
 On 17 March 2016, the day after the declaration of the Autonomous Administration of North and East Syria, U.S. Defense Secretary Ashton Carter praised the SDF component militia People's Protection Units (YPG) as having "proven to be excellent partners of ours on the ground in fighting ISIL. We are grateful for that, and we intend to continue to do that, recognizing the complexities of their regional role."
 During the SDF's May 2016 offensive against ISIL in Northern Raqqa, the presence of U.S. Special Forces was widely reported, and several photographs of them wearing badges of the YPG and YPJ on their uniforms circulated.

 On 21 May 2016, General Joseph Votel, commanding general of U.S. Central Command, completed a secret several-hour-long trip to northern Syria to visit several locations where there were U.S. special operations forces and meet with local forces the U.S. was helping train to fight ISIL. The visit came as the first of 250 additional U.S. special operations forces were beginning to arrive in Syria to work with local forces. The commander overseeing the war in Syria, at the end of a long Saturday spent touring SDF bases, said "We do, absolutely, have to go with what we've got".
 During the SDF's summer 2016 Manbij offensive against ISIL, the U.S. Air Force as well as the special operations forces of several Western nations supported the SDF advance. The Syrian Observatory for Human Rights stated that besides US special forces, German and French forces were participating. France later confirmed that it had sent its own troops into Syria in an advisory capacity to train the Syrian Democratic Forces to fight against ISIL.
 After two Syrian Air Force SU-24s started air strikes in Al-Hasakah, on 19 August 2016, near where coalition forces were conducting operations on the ground, coalition aircraft arrived and the United States Department of Defense said that "It troubles us when we see regime air strikes in Hasakah in an area where it is well known by everybody, to include the Assad regime, that the coalition is actively engaged in operations against Isis", implicitly recognizing that elite troops are training and supporting the YPG and the Syrian Democratic Forces in the area.
 During the late summer 2016 Turkish military intervention in the Syrian Civil War in the Manbij Region, U.S. Special Operations Forces embedded themselves with SDF forces to successfully deter Turkish-backed jihadi rebels from attacking SDF forces south of the Sajur river. Further, the United States Department of Defense confirmed that U.S. Special Operation Forces were flying U.S. flags in the town of Tell Abyad in the Euphrates Region to deter Turkish harassment shelling or attacks against SDF forces there.
 During the SDF's late summer 2016 Western al-Bab offensive against ISIL, the U.S. Air Force provided close combat support for SDF forces.
 In late September 2016, the U.S. spokesman for the Combined Joint Task Force – Operation Inherent Resolve (CJTF–OIR) confirmed that the SDF, including the YPG, is also part of the "vetted forces" in the train and equip program and will be supplied with weapons. The President of Turkey, Recep Tayyip Erdoğan, condemned this and stated that the SDF are "endangering our future".
 Early October 2016, media reports highlighted construction work on another military airfield in SDF controlled territory for operations of U.S. air assets, in the vicinity of al-Shaddadah in the Jazira Region, in addition to the two airfields the U.S. is widely reported to already co-operate there: Abu Hajar Airport in Rmelan in the Jazira Region and one airfield at the village of Septe south of Kobanî in the Euphrates Region.

 In late October 2016, U.S. Army Lt. Gen. Stephen J. Townsend, the commander of the international coalition against the Islamic State of Iraq and the Levant, said that the SDF would lead the impending assault on Raqqa, ISIL's stronghold and capital, and that SDF commanders would plan the operation with advice from American and coalition troops. From November, more than 300 U.S. Special Operations Forces were embedded to train and advise SDF fighters in the Raqqa offensive.
 In January 2017, the European Syriac Union in Brussels requested the US to provide more support for the Assyrian and Kurdish components of the Syrian Democratic Forces. The US reportedly favoured the Arab components in the SDF, in April the MFS and the HSNB reaffirming the request for more support from the US.
 In late January 2017, the SDF received a number of armoured personnel carriers produced by ArmorGroup and supplied by the US.
 In February 2017, Stephen Townsend visited Kobanî. On 25 February, the US Central Command stated that it would continue to train and equip forces of the Manbij Military Council. During the East Aleppo offensive (February–March 2017), the US deployed troops and armored vehicles to villages near Manbij in an attempt to "deter" the skirmishes between the SDF and Turkey-backed forces west and north of Manbij.
 In late March 2017, the US delivered 30 more Guardian armoured vehicles to the SDF for use in the Raqqa offensive.
 In late April 2017, the U.S. just as in the summer 2016 once again deployed U.S. troops embedded with the SDF to the border between the Autonomous Administration of North and East Syria/Syria and Turkey, in order to deter Turkish aggressions against the SDF, which this time coincided with the SDF's breakthrough advances against ISIL in the Raqqa campaign.

 On 9 May 2017, it was announced by the Pentagon that American President Donald Trump approved of a plan that would have the United States directly provide heavy armaments to the major SDF component group, the YPG; the plan comes before a planned final offensive to capture Raqqa from ISIL.
 By July 2017, more than 8,500 members of the SDF have been trained by the US-led coalition and in the first half of 2017, more than 400 vehicles and other equipment have been delivered to over 40,000 SDF troops.
 According to a report from the Kurdish news network Kurdistan 24, the major SDF component group, YPG forces, received about 800 truckloads of military supplies from the Pentagon from early June to the end of July 2017.
 In a joint report published on 12 September 2017, the Organized Crime and Corruption Reporting Project (OCCRP) and the Balkan Investigative Reporting Network (BIRN) reported that the Pentagon had so far delivered up to $2.2 billion worth of weapons to the Syrian Democratic Forces.
 In late November 2017, Turkish officials stated that Trump told Erdoğan during their 24 November phone conversation that the U.S. would end arms supplies to the SDF. Erdoğan said: "For the first time in a long while, a common wavelength was reached." But Syrian Democratic Forces (SDF) denied on 28 November that there was a halt in the Washington armament, saying they were provided with weapons by the U.S. the day before. Kurdish officials also said on 27 November that the United States would only "adjust" its delivery of weapons to the SDF. U.S. officials also stated that they would continue to work with their Kurdish and Arab partners of SDF but will only review and adjust its delivery of weapons which is being done regularly. The International Coalition also confirmed its support for SDF is ongoing.
 On 12 February 2018, the United States Department of Defense released a budget blueprint for 2019 which with respect to the Autonomous Administration of North and East Syria, including $300 million for the SDF and $250 million for border security.
 On 29 March 2018, French President Emmanuel Macron vowed to send troops to Syria's Manbij in a bid to assist local SDF militias in preventing Turkish forces from advancing on the town.

 In December 2018, U.S. Kurdish allies in Syria discussed the release of 3,200 ISIS prisoners, a prominent monitoring group and a Western official of the anti-Islamic State coalition said, a day after President Trump ordered the withdrawal of all American troops from the country. The SDF denied that such talks have taken place.
 On 7 October 2019, President of the United States Donald Trump announced that the US would be withdrawing all troops stationed at the border of Turkey currently in cooperation with the SDF. This has led to fears of a possible re-emergence of Islamic State of Iraq and the Levant due to SDF-controlled ISIS prisons and possible restoration of fighting in the Syrian Civil War, with current conflict being limited in the Syrian Civil War.

Reported internal conflict between SDF factions 
 In November 2015, Liwa Thuwar al-Raqqa merged with the Tribal Army to form Jabhat Thuwar al-Raqqa to become part of the SDF. After some tensions between the group and the People's Protection Units (YPG), on 6 January 2016 the group reportedly issued a statement stating it was disbanding. Later the same month, some sources stated that the Liwa Thuwar al-Raqqa reappeared, announcing it had decided to rejoin the SDF.
 Turkey has at various times tried and failed to incite tensions along ethnic lines within the SDF. At the height of one such attempts after the start of the summer 2016 Manbij offensive, Sheikh Farouk al-Mashi, an ethnic Arab former member of the Syrian parliament and designated co-chairman of the Manbij City Council, stated: "I have a Syrian ID, and Kurds have a Syrian ID. Let those people who talk against us in Turkey and Europe come here and fight ISIS. Why this distortion in media about problems between Kurds and Arabs?" Ethnic Kurdish fellow co-chairman Salih Haji Mohammed stated: "In our social contract, we say we want to have good relations with neighboring countries like Turkey. Any country that does not interfere in Manbij and our areas, we will have good relations with." A fighter gave his perspective as "we have Arabs, Kurds, nobody knows how many exactly, we all work under the SDF-forces".
 In September 2016, during the Turkish military intervention in the Syrian Civil War, the leader of small SDF component group Liwa al-Tahrir, Abdul Karim Obeid, defected to the camp of Turkish-backed rebels with 20 to 100 of his men, citing opposition to reported YPG domination of the SDF, while SDF sources suggested he was displeased with the civil administration of the Autonomous Administration of North and East Syria replacing warlordist political rule in the Free Syrian Army style. The remaining fighters stayed with the SDF.
 Also, in September 2016, during the Turkish military intervention, some Arab sources reported that Liwa Ahrar al-Raqqa clashed with the YPG, however two days later the Liwa Ahrar al-Raqqa's commander said that news about the clashes and defections were false, he denied that such clashes had ever happened.
 In mid-November 2016, Liwa Thuwar al-Raqqa's political bureau, which has strong connections with Turkey, condemned the SDF's Raqqa offensive led by the YPG. This caused tensions between the group's political bureau, who opposes the YPG, and the overall leader and military commander of Jabhat Thuwar al-Raqqa, Abu Issa, who is allied with the YPG. Some members of Jabhat Thuwar al-Raqqa left the group and joined the SDF's Liwa Ahrar al-Raqqa, in response to the tensions.
 On 10 December 2016, the second phase of the Northern al-Raqqa campaign was announced, with Jabhat Thuwar al-Raqqa participating under the SDF. 2 weeks later, the Raqqa Hawks Brigade reportedly captured several Thuwar al-Raqqa military commanders and forced them to announce their defection. On 27 December, the commanders declared on video that they are still with Thuwar al-Raqqa. On 20 February 2017, one sub-commander of the Raqqa Hawks Brigade, Abu Yamen al-Meko, who reportedly had strong links to the Military Intelligence Directorate, declared his loyalty to Bashar al-Assad and formed the pro-government unit "Tajamou al-Shamal". His followers consequently raised the Ba'athist flag at their headquarters in the village of al-Fares. These actions, however, provoked the ire of Jabhat Thuwar al-Raqqa, which launched a surprise attack on al-Fares two days later and destroyed al-Meko's faction, killing or capturing its members. Jabhat Thuwar al-Raqqa went on to declare that it "would never allow the regime and its supporting militia to re-enter the city [of Raqqa] by any means".
 On 10 April 2017, a spokesman for the Elite Forces stated that the group is not part of the SDF, will cooperate with both the SDF and Rojava Peshmerga to capture Deir ez-Zor, and rejected federalism. On 15 April, this statement was denied by Muhammad Khalid Shakir, the official spokesman of the Elite Forces. He denied any disagreements between the Elite Forces and the SDF and said that "We are in the framework of the international coalition. The leadership of the coalition manages the operations on the ground. Our troops did not withdraw. We have completed the third phase of the Wrath of Euphrates Operation, and we will participate in all stages until Raqqa and Deir ez-Zor are freed."
 On 28 September 2017, Yasser al-Dahla, commander of the Gathering of al-Baggara Youth, part of the SDF's Deir ez-Zor Military Council, was arrested by SDF military police, which said Dahla was effectively participating in the SDF's Deir ez-Zor offensive and the "lack of military discipline". The Gathering of al-Baggara Youth denied these charges, and said the Deir ez-Zor Military Council was denying Euphrates Shield fighters who defected to the SDF to join the Gathering. Dahla reportedly threatened to cease his group's participation in the Deir ez-Zor offensive.
 On 15 November 2017, Talal Silo, surrendered or defected to the Turkish Army. The nature of his leaving the SDF being up for dispute.
 On 20 December 2017, Hussam Awak announced his resignation from the SDF on his Facebook page without providing any reasons.
In May 2018, tensions began to build up between members of Arab tribes, including Liwa Thuwar al-Raqqa, and the rest of the SDF and the Raqqa Internal Security Forces over recruitment issues in Raqqa. A curfew was put in place in both Raqqa city and the rest of the governorate on 23 June, as the SDF and RISF besieged Thuwar al-Raqqa's headquarters and arrested between 90 and 200 of its members the next day. By 25 June, the SDF and RISF captured all of Thuwar al-Raqqa fighters and their weapons in Raqqa, completely defeating the group, and the curfew was ended. Following Liwa Thuwar al-Raqqa's defeat by the SDF and RISF, Abu Issa met with tribal leaders and SDF officials to discuss surrender and reconciliation. He was reportedly offered a position in the SDF general command. Abu Issa would later go on to deny he was ever arrested by the SDF or the RISF.

War crimes 

On 15 March 2017, a video surfaced that showed members of the Northern Sun Battalion reportedly torturing an ISIL fighter, who had been captured while planting mines. One of these mines had reportedly killed nine fighters of the battalion, leading five others to take revenge on the ISIL militant. The Manbij Military Council condemned the act, and announced that the involved Northern Sun Battalion fighters would be held for trial for violating the Geneva Conventions. The five accused were arrested on 17 March.

Ethnic cleansing and forced displacement 

In June 2015 the Turkish government and Amnesty International reported that the YPG was carrying out an ethnic cleansing of non-Kurdish populations as part of a plan to join the Jazira and Euphrates regions into a single territory.

The U.S. State Department reacted by stating they would 'scrutinise' Amnesty International's accusations. The U.S. State Department stated it had to determine if there was "any veracity to the claims", but showed concern by calling for any administrator in the area to rule "with respect for all groups regardless of ethnicity". The report makes accusations of looting, coercing civilians to join their armed forces and the forced targeted displacement of 1400 families in the Turkman villages of Hammam al-Turkman, 800 Turkmen from Mela Berho and Suluk residents. The report offers unnamed witness testimony from reported victims, cross referenced with photo and video evidence, media reports, and satellite imagery to substantiate these reports.

In a report published by the United Nations' Independent International Commission of Inquiry on the Syrian Arab Republic on 10 March 2017, the Commission refuted Amnesty International's reports of ethnic cleansing, stating that "'though allegations of 'ethnic cleansing' continued to be received during the period under review, the Commission found no evidence to substantiate reports that YPG or SDF forces ever targeted Arab communities on the basis of ethnicity".

In interviews, YPG spokespersons acknowledged that a number of families were in fact displaced. However, they placed the number at no more than 25, and stated military necessity. They stated that the family members of terrorists maintained communications with them, and therefore had to be removed from areas where they might pose a danger. They further reported that ISIL was using civilians in those areas to plant car bombs or carry out other attacks on the YPG.

Recruitment of minors 

In June 2014, Human Rights Watch criticized the YPG for accepting minors into their ranks, picking up on multiple earlier reports of teenage fighters serving in the YPG, with a report by the United Nations Secretary General stating that 24 minors under age of 18 had been recruited by YPG, with 124 having been recruited by the Free Syrian Army and 5 by the Syrian Arab Army. In response, the YPG and YPJ signed the Geneva Call Deed of Commitment protecting children in armed conflict, prohibiting sexual violence and against gender discrimination in July 2014, and Kurdish security forces (YPG and Asayish) began receiving human rights training from Geneva Call and other international organisations with the YPG pledging publicly to demobilize all fighters under 18 within a month and began to enact disciplinary measures against commanders of the units that had involved in corruption and accepting recruit under age of 18 to their ranks. In October 2015 the YPG demobilized 21 minors from the military service in its ranks.

In response to reports issued by international organisations such as Human Rights Watch, the general command of the SDF issued a military order prohibiting the recruitment of children.  On 29 June 2019 Abdi, as representative of the SDF, signed the action plan of the United Nations aiming to prevent the enlistment of child soldiers in the armed forces. The action plan was signed to address the inclusion of the YPG in the SDF.

In 2020, United Nations reported SDF as the largest faction in the Syrian civil war by the number recruited child soldiers, with 283 child soldiers followed by Hayat Tahrir al-Sham with 245 child soldiers.

See also 
 List of armed groups in the Syrian Civil War
 Syrian Democratic Council
 Movement for a Democratic Society
 Democratic Union Party (Syria)
 Federalization of Syria
 Rojava conflict
 Autonomous Administration of North and East Syria
 Foreign relations of North and East Syria
 Relations with the Syrian government
 YPG–FSA relations

References

Bibliography

External links 

 Official website 
 Official website 
 Official website 
 Fehim Taştekin: "US backing ensures Arab-Kurd alliance in Syria will survive", Al-Monitor, 8 September 2016

 
Anti-ISIL factions in Syria
Military units and factions of the Syrian civil war
Military units and formations established in 2015
Operations rooms of the Syrian civil war
Syrian Kurdistan
2015 establishments in Syria